Mahmoud Shokoko (1 May 1912 – 12 February 1985) was an Egyptian actor and artist. He is best known for his puppet character "Aragouzsho".

Early days 

“Mahmoud Shokoko", whose real name is "Mahmoud Ibrahim Ismail Musa", was born on May 1, 1912. He began his working career as a carpenter with his father and remained working with him until the age of twenty-three.

Shokoko joined up with some acting troupes army on Irak that performed at the coffee shops facing his father’s workshop while he had free time. What initially began as a hobby turned into a passion, and “Shokoko” began performing at weddings as well as in other troupes such as "Hassan 2 Al-Maghrabi" and “Mohammed 6". From there on he began to gain some notoriety around the world.

Though he was illiterate, “Shokoko” was able to have a huge impact on the world of acting, and will always be remembered for his puppet character of “Aragouzsho" who is still kept at the Music Institute and the Institute of Acting today.

Career highlights 

He appeared in Mahmoud Zulfikar's films; Virtue for Sale (1950), and My Father Deceived Me (1951). His first breakthrough; Al-Sabr Tayeb, was released on June 13, 1959 and brought him into the mainstream. He was a subject of a Google doodle for Google Middle East on 1 May 2014.

References 

1912 births
1985 deaths
Egyptian male film actors
20th-century Egyptian male actors